Latvia participated in the Eurovision Song Contest 2022 in Turin, Italy, with "Eat Your Salad" performed by . The Latvian broadcaster  (LTV) organised the national final  2022 in order to select the Latvian entry for the contest. 17 songs were selected to compete in the national final, which consisted of two shows: a semi-final and a final. In the semi-final on 5 February 2022, ten entries were selected to advance alongside a wildcard selected by LTV. Eleven songs ultimately qualified to compete in the final on 12 February 2022 where a public televote and a seven-member jury panel selected "Eat Your Salad" performed by Citi Zēni as the winner.

Latvia was drawn to compete in the first semi-final of the Eurovision Song Contest which took place on 10 May 2022. Performing during the show in position 2, "Eat Your Salad" was not announced among the top 10 entries of the first semi-final and therefore did not qualify to compete in the final. It was later revealed that Latvia placed fourteenth out of the 17 participating countries in the semi-final with 55 points.

Background 

Prior to the 2022 contest, Latvia has participated in the Eurovision Song Contest twenty-one times since its first entry in 2000. Between 2009 and 2014, the nation had failed to qualify to the final for six consecutive years before managing to qualify to the final in 2015 and 2016. Latvia had failed to qualify to the final for four consecutive years since 2017 including with their  entry "The Moon Is Rising" performed by Samanta Tīna.

The Latvian national broadcaster,  (LTV), broadcasts the event within Latvia and organises the selection process for the nation's entry. LTV confirmed their intentions to participate at the 2022 Eurovision Song Contest on 30 August 2021. Latvia has selected their entries for the Eurovision Song Contest through a national final, with the exception of 2021 when the Latvian entry was internally selected. Since their debut in 2000 until 2012, LTV had organised the selection show . After failing to produce successful entries those two years, LTV developed and had organised the  national final since 2015. Along with their participation confirmation, the broadcaster announced that they would return with organising  2022 in order to select the Latvian entry for the 2022 contest.

Before Eurovision

Supernova 2022 
The competition commenced with the semi-final on 5 February 2022 and concluded with a final on 12 February 2022. All shows in the competition took place at the LTV studios in Riga, hosted by Ketija Šēnberga and 2003 Latvian Eurovision entrant Lauris Reiniks and broadcast on LTV1 as well as online via the streaming platform Replay.lv. An alternative broadcast also occurred on LTV7 with presentation in sign language.

Format 
The format of the competition consisted of two shows: a semi-final and a final. The semi-final, held on 5 February 2022, featured seventeen competing entries from which the top ten advanced to the final from each show. LTV also advanced a wildcard act to the final from the remaining non-qualifying entries in the semi-final. The final, held on 12 February 2022, selected the Latvian entry for Turin from the remaining eleven entries. Results during the semi-final and final shows were determined by the 50/50 combination of votes from a jury panel and a public vote, with both the jury and public vote assigning points from 1-8, 10 and 12 based on the number of competing songs in the respective show. Ties were decided in favour of the entries that received higher points from the public. Viewers were able to vote via telephone or via SMS.

The jury voted in each show and selected entries to advance in the competition. The panel consisted of:

 Anna Platpīre – content editor at LTV
 Māris Mihelsons – musician
 Laura Jēkabsone – composer and singer
 Toms Grēviņš – radio DJ and television presenter
 Ilya Lagutenko – Russian musician, represented Russia in the Eurovision Song Contest 2001 as member of Mumiy Troll
 Nicolau Tudela – Portuguese artistic television director
 Julian Guiterrez – French television director

Competing entries

Artists and songwriters were able to submit their entries to the broadcaster between 7 October 2021 and 7 December 2021. A record 130 entries were submitted at the conclusion of the submission period. A jury panel appointed by LTV evaluated the submitted songs and selected sixteen performers and songs, which were announced on 5 January 2022. Among the artists were Reinis Sējāns (member of Bujāns) who represented Latvia in the Eurovision Song Contest 2006 as part of Cosmos, Intars Busulis (member of Bujāns) who represented Latvia in the Eurovision Song Contest 2009, Emīls Balceris and Marats Ogļezņevs (members of Bermudu Divstūris) who both represented Latvia in the Eurovision Song Contest 2011 as Musiqq, Ralfs Eilands (member of ) who represented Latvia in the Eurovision Song Contest 2013 as part of PeR, and Aminata who represented Latvia in the Eurovision Song Contest 2015. An additional entry, "I'm Just a Sinner" performed by Miks Galvanovskis, was announced on 15 January 2022 following an online vote among ten entries on the official Supernova website between 10 and 14 January 2022. Among the artists competing in the online vote was Katrīna Dimanta who represented Latvia in the Eurovision Song Contest 2014 as part of Aarzemnieki.

Shows

Semi-final 
The semi-final took place on 5 February 2022. In the semi-final seventeen acts competed and the top ten entries qualified to the final based on the combination of votes from a jury panel and the Latvian public. On 10 February 2022, LTV announced that the song "First Love" performed by Miks Dukurs had been awarded a wildcard to qualify to the final due to technical issues that impacted his semi-final performance.

Final 
The final took place on 12 February 2022. The eleven entries that qualified from the semi-final competed. In addition to the performances of the competing entries, the show featured guest performances by 2021 Estonian Eurovision entrant Uku Suviste and 2021 Lithuanian Eurovision entrant The Roop.

Ratings

Preparation 
On 22 March, Citi Zēni released the official music video for "Eat Your Salad", which was directed by Niklāvs Vētra, produced by Mārtiņš Goldbergs and Elīna Sargune, and choreographed by Beāte Svarinska with support from the Riga Tourism Development Bureau LiveRiga.

Promotion 
Citi Zēni made several appearances across Europe to specifically promote "Eat Your Salad" as the Latvian Eurovision entry. On 26 March, Citi Zēni performed during the Barcelona Eurovision Party, which was held at the Sala Apolo venue in Barcelona, Spain and hosted by Sharonne and Giuseppe Di Bella. On 3 April, Citi Zēni performed during the London Eurovision Party, which was held at the Hard Rock Hotel in London, United Kingdom and hosted by Paddy O'Connell and SuRie. On 7 April, Citi Zēni performed during the Israel Calling event held at the Menora Mivtachim Arena in Tel Aviv, Israel. On 9 April, Citi Zēni performed during the Eurovision in Concert event which was held at the AFAS Live venue in Amsterdam, Netherlands and hosted by Cornald Maas and Edsilia Rombley. On 16 April, Citi Zēni performed during the PrePartyES 2022 event which was held at the Sala La Riviera venue in Madrid, Spain and hosted by Ruth Lorenzo. On 30 April, Citi Zēni performed during the Adriatic PreParty which was held online and organised by Hrvatski Eurovizijski Klub.

In addition to their international appearances, Citi Zēni appeared during the Zelta Mikrofons 2022 award show on 26 February, held at the Art and Media Technical School in Riga where they received the ELVI Song of the Year award for their song "Limuzīns Uz Krīta". The band also released several acoustic and drum covers of former and 2022 Eurovision songs prior to the contest, including a performance recreation of the  Latvian winning entry "I Wanna" performed by Marie N.

At Eurovision 

According to Eurovision rules, all nations with the exceptions of the host country and the "Big Five" (France, Germany, Italy, Spain and the United Kingdom) are required to qualify from one of two semi-finals in order to compete for the final; the top ten countries from each semi-final progress to the final. The European Broadcasting Union (EBU) split up the competing countries into six different pots based on voting patterns from previous contests, with countries with favourable voting histories put into the same pot. On 25 January 2022, an allocation draw was held which placed each country into one of the two semi-finals, as well as which half of the show they would perform in. Latvia was placed into the first semi-final, which was held on 10 May 2022, and was scheduled to perform in the first half of the show.

Once all the competing songs for the 2022 contest had been released, the running order for the semi-finals was decided by the shows' producers rather than through another draw, so that similar songs were not placed next to each other.

The Latvian spokesperson, who announced the top 12-point score awarded by the Latvian jury during the final, was Samanta Tīna.

Semi-final
Citi Zēni took part in technical rehearsals on 30 April and 4 May, followed by dress rehearsals on 9 and 10 May. This included the jury show on 9 May where the professional juries of each country watched and voted on the competing entries. The Latvian performance featured the members of Citi Zēni performing on stage wearing brightly coloured suits in a retro fashion to match the style of the song. The performance was fast paced and featured audience interaction and brightly coloured LED lights in the background. The performance was concluded with lead singer Jānis Pētersons performing a split. The performance also featured pyrotechnic effects.

At the end of the show, Latvia was not announced among the top 10 entries in the first semi-final and therefore failed to qualify to compete in the final. This was Latvia's fifth consecutive non-qualification to the grand final having last appeared in 2016. It was later revealed that Latvia placed fourteenth in the semi-final, receiving a total of 55 points: 16 points from the televoting and 39 points from the juries.

Voting 

Voting during the three shows involved each country awarding two sets of points from 1-8, 10 and 12: one from their professional jury and the other from televoting. Each nation's jury consisted of five music industry professionals who are citizens of the country they represent. This jury judged each entry based on: vocal capacity; the stage performance; the song's composition and originality; and the overall impression by the act. In addition, each member of a national jury may only take part in the panel once every three years, and no jury was permitted to discuss of their vote with other members or be related in any way to any of the competing acts in such a way that they cannot vote impartially and independently. The individual rankings of each jury member in an anonymised form as well as the nation's televoting results were released shortly after the grand final.

Below is a breakdown of points awarded to Latvia and awarded by Latvia in the first semi-final and grand final of the contest, and the breakdown of the jury voting and televoting conducted during the two shows:

Points awarded to Latvia

Points awarded by Latvia

Detailed voting results
The following members comprised the Latvian jury:
 Anna Platpire – Commissioning editor
 Ģirts Lūsis – Musician
 Ikars Ruņģis – Musician
 Kaspars Ansons – Musician
 Laura Jēkabsone – Composer, Singer

References

External links 
 
 

2022
Countries in the Eurovision Song Contest 2022
Eurovision